Saifur Rehman   is a Pakistani politician who had been a member of the National Assembly of Pakistan from August 2018 till January 2023.

Political career
He was elected to the National Assembly of Pakistan from Constituency NA-242 (Karachi East-I) as a candidate of Pakistan Tehreek-e-Insaf in 2018 Pakistani general election.

See also
 List of members of the 15th National Assembly of Pakistan

References

External Link
 

Living people
Pakistani MNAs 2018–2023
Pakistan Tehreek-e-Insaf politicians
Year of birth missing (living people)